OCW may refer to:

 OpenCourseWare, university material that is available for all to see and use
 OCW, The Dutch ministry of Education, Culture and Science
 OCW, abbreviation of The Oxford Companion to Wine
 OCW, abbreviation of Oklahoma College for Women
 One cool word, a Vancouver-based arts magazine